Mark Bedworth, known locally as Bedders, is a Rugby Union Footballer who is currently player Coach at Westoe RFC.  Mark Bedworth was born in Durham City in 1982 and attended Bow Preparatory School before moving onto Durham School where he is now a teacher of Physical Education. Having completed his A-levels, he continued to university in York.  An excellent points kicker he became one of the all-time top scorers in National League 2 North and National League 1 with over 2,000 points scored between the two divisions.

Rugby union career 

Bedworth began his career at Darlington Mowden Park RFC at the age of 18 helping the club to win promotion to National Division Three North before moving on to play in National League 1 with Wharfedale at the start of the 2005–06 season. He scored more than 1,000 points for Wharfedale in over 100 games before moving to Westoe as a player coach in 2010 where he finished his career at the end of the 2011–12 season.  Throughout his career Bedworth was a great kicker averaging over 200 points a season for the three north-east clubs he played for and is one of the top scorers of all time in. National League 1.

In a 10-year career he has represented England Counties XV in 2007 which included a tour of Russia where he scored one try.  He also represented The full Barbarians XV twice and County Durham at County Level throughout his career.

Season-by-season playing stats

Honours 

Darlington Mowden Park
North Division 1 champions: 2000-01

Wharfedale
Yorkshire Cup winners: 2010-11

County/Representative
Selected for Durham County
Selected for England Counties XV: 2007, 2009
Selected for Barbarians XV: 2007-09

References

External links 
 Westoe RFC
 Durham Rugby 

1982 births
Durham County RFU players
English rugby union players
Living people
People educated at Durham School
Rugby union players from Durham, England
Wharfedale R.U.F.C. players
Rugby union fly-halves